Fine Wine is a 2021 Nigerian romantic comedy film directed by Seyi Babatope and written by Temitope Akinbode and Diche Enunwa. The film stars Richard Mofe-Damijo, Ego Nwosu, Zainab Balogun, Nse Ikpe-Etim in the lead roles. The film had its theatrical release on 12 February 2021 on the eve of Valentine's weekend.

Plot
Seye George (Richard Mofe-Damijo), a divorced entrepreneur with two adult children—socialite/events manager Temi (Zainab Balogun) and London-based investment banker Sammy (Baaj Adebule)—is named Forbes Africa's Top African Businessman. To finance his newest venture—a winery—George applies for a loan with a bank where Tunji (Demola Adedoyin), an ambitious but toxic accounts officer, is her supervisor. Tunji's girlfriend Kaima (Ego Nwosu) is a corper and aspiring banker whose tenure with her workplace is almost complete but her future uncertain, as is her relationship with Tunji who hardly appreciates her.

Kaima is furious when Tunji cancels their date as he is busy running work-related errands, but she agrees to meet him in a high-end restaurant where he runs late. A frustrated Kaima waits until George sits at her table, assuming she is the reporter (Georgette Monnou) who has arranged to meet him. Kaima mistakenly believes he is making a pass at her, and rudely chastises him before departing, leaving George stunned. Tunji suddenly arrives with documents for George to sign, and Kaima realises she has made a mistake which infuriates Tunji who orders her to apologise.

Kaima approaches George at his workplace with a bottle of wine as a peace offering; he accepts her apology and invites her out to lunch where they discuss her career. At the bank, Kaima's position is retained after George pulls in a favour with the bank manager (Segun Arinze), but Tunji's job is threatened after a transaction error. He asks his girlfriend to convince George to sign new documents, and she finds him ill with the flu at his residence but offers to make her mother's medicinal peppersoup which quickly helps him recover. To show his gratitude, George invites Kaima to dinner at his home where they taste wine from his winery.

Tunji grows suspicious of Kaima's friendship with the considerably older George and accuses her of cheating on him which she denies. However, Kaima accepts George's invitation to celebrate her birthday on a yacht, not realising a spy has taken photos of the pair. Upon her arrival home, she discovers Tunji has thrown her an impromptu birthday party after implying he had forgotten, and he proposes in front of their guests which she halfheartedly accepts. Tunji is enraged when photos of her and George on the yacht are subsequently leaked, but Kaima's mother (Tina Mba) begs him not to break off the engagement.

Upon realising the egocentric Tunji would never turn a new leaf after he delivers yet another put-down, Kaima dumps him publicly, stating George is more of a gentleman than he would ever be, and Kaima's sister Kamsi (Bofie Itombra) reveals Tunji had indeed forgotten Kaima's birthday until she reminded him. However, Kaima remains uncertain of a future with George, especially after his ex-wife Ame (Nse Ikpe-Etim) warns her to keep her distance, until George reminds Ame she had left him for a more prosperous man years before George acquired his own wealth, making her the actual gold-digger. He warns his ex to permanently stay out of his affairs, or he would cut her off financially, to which she agrees.

Kaima, who has resigned herself to losing George forever, is surprised to find him pulling up to her house with Temi. It is here Kaima's friend Angela (Belinda Effah) confesses to releasing footage of her breakup with Tunji on social media which Temi subsequently showed her father, confirming Kaima's true feelings. George asks Kaima again what she wants for her birthday to which she replies "You".

Cast 
 Richard Mofe-Damijo - George
 Ego Nwosu - Kaima
 Nse Ikpe-Etim - Ame
 Ademola Adedoyin - Tunji
 Belinda Effah - Angela 
 Zainab Balogun - Temi
 Tina Mba - Kaima's mother 
 Keppy Ekpenyong - Akin
 Segun Arinze - Bank manager

References 

English-language Nigerian films
Nigerian romantic comedy films
2021 romantic comedy films
2020s English-language films